Garcinia gardneriana, the bacupari, is an evergreen, dioecious species of the genus Garcinia. It is distributed throughout South America's Amazon Basin and produces fruit with edible arils.

Synonyms
 Rheedia gardneriana Planch. & Triana	
 Rheedia spruceana Engl.

References

External links
 
 

gardneriana